The New York State Snowmobile Association (NYSSA) is a non-profit organization that was organized in 1975 as the NY Snowmobile Coordinating Group. NYSSA’s operations are governed by a board of directors selected by the individual clubs in each of the 40 districts around the state. NYSSA continues to be the largest snowmobile association in the world. Membership in an individual club has many benefits that include automatically being a member of NYSSA, a $55 discount on snowmobile registrations, as well as supporting maintenance of trails in New York State.

See also
List of snowmobile trails in New York (state)

References

Outdoor recreation organizations
Organizations based in New York (state)
Tourism in New York (state)
Snowmobiles
1975 establishments in New York (state)